Rueyres may refer to:

 Rueyres, Switzerland
 Rueyres-les-Prés, Switzerland
 Rueyres, Lot, a commune of the Lot department, southwestern France